Maha Kali is an EP by the Swedish extreme metal band Dissection. It was the first release after the rebirth of Dissection, shortly after Jon Nödtveidt was released from prison. It represents the band's change from a melodic black/death sound to a more Gothenburg-based sound of melodic death metal. The song "Maha Kali" also appears on the live DVD Rebirth of Dissection, and was re-recorded and included on Dissection's last full-length album, Reinkaos; "Unhallowed (Rebirth Version)" is a re-recording from Storm of the Light's Bane. Maha Kali entered the Swedish charts at number 50.

Track listing
 "Maha Kali" – 6:01
 "Unhallowed (Rebirth Version)" – 6:06

See also
Mahakali

References

Dissection (band) EPs
2004 EPs